In physics, a unified field theory (UFT) is a type of field theory that allows all that is usually thought of as fundamental forces and elementary particles to be written in terms of a pair of physical and virtual fields. According to the modern discoveries in physics, forces are not transmitted directly between interacting objects but instead are described and interrupted by intermediary entities called fields.

Classically, however, a duality of the fields is combined into a single physical field. For over a century, unified field theory has remained an open line of research and the term was coined by Albert Einstein, who attempted to unify his general theory of relativity with electromagnetism. The "Theory of Everything"  and Grand Unified Theory are closely related to unified field theory, but differ by not requiring the basis of nature to be fields, and often by attempting to explain physical constants of nature. Earlier attempts based on classical physics are described in the article on classical unified field theories.

The goal of a unified field theory has led to a great deal of progress for future theoretical physics, and progress continues.

Introduction to the Great Theory

Forces 

All four of the known fundamental forces are mediated by fields, which in the Standard Model of particle physics result from the exchange of gauge bosons. Specifically, the four fundamental interactions to be unified are:
Strong interaction: the interaction responsible for holding quarks together to form hadrons, and holding neutrons and also protons together to form atomic nuclei. The exchange particle that mediates this force is the gluon.
Electromagnetic interaction: the familiar interaction that acts on electrically charged particles. The photon is the exchange particle for this force.
Weak interaction: a short-range interaction responsible for some forms of  radioactivity, that acts on electrons, neutrinos, and quarks. It is mediated by the W and Z bosons.
Gravitational interaction: a long-range attractive interaction that acts on all particles. The postulated exchange particle has been named the graviton.

Modern unified field theory attempts to bring these four forces and matter together into a single framework.

History

Classic theory 
The first successful classical unified field theory was developed by James Clerk Maxwell.  In 1820, Hans Christian Ørsted discovered that electric currents exerted forces on magnets, while in 1831, Michael Faraday made the observation that time-varying magnetic fields could induce electric currents. Until then, electricity and magnetism had been thought of as unrelated phenomena. In 1864, Maxwell published his famous paper on a dynamical theory of the electromagnetic field. This was the first example of a theory that was able to encompass previously separate field theories (namely electricity and magnetism) to provide a unifying theory of electromagnetism. By 1905, Albert Einstein had used the constancy of the speed of light in Maxwell's theory to unify our notions of space and time into an entity we now call spacetime and in 1915 he expanded this theory of special relativity to a description of gravity, general relativity, using a field to describe the curving geometry of four-dimensional spacetime.

In the years following the creation of the general theory, a large number of physicists and mathematicians enthusiastically participated in the attempt to unify the then-known fundamental interactions. In view of later developments in this domain, of particular interest are the theories of Hermann Weyl of 1919, who introduced the concept of an (electromagnetic) gauge field in a classical field theory and, two years later, that of Theodor Kaluza, who extended General Relativity to five dimensions. Continuing in this latter direction, Oscar Klein proposed in 1926 that the fourth spatial dimension be curled up into a small, unobserved circle. In Kaluza–Klein theory, the gravitational curvature of the extra spatial direction behaves as an additional force similar to electromagnetism. These and other models of electromagnetism and gravity were pursued by Albert Einstein in his attempts at a classical unified field theory. By 1930 Einstein had already considered the Einstein-Maxwell–Dirac System [Dongen]. One can extend this system to include the weak and strong nuclear forces to get the Einstein–Yang-Mills–Dirac System. The French physicist Marie-Antoinette Tonnelat published a paper in the early 1940s on the standard commutation relations for the quantized spin-2 field. She continued this work in collaboration with Erwin Schrödinger after World War II. In the 1960s Mendel Sachs proposed a generally covariant field theory that did not require recourse to renormalization or perturbation theory. In 1965, Tonnelat published a book on the state of research on unified field theories.

Modern progress 
In 1963, American physicist Sheldon Glashow proposed that the weak nuclear force, electricity, and magnetism could arise from a partially unified electroweak theory. In 1967,  Pakistani Abdus Salam and American Steven Weinberg independently revised Glashow's theory by having the masses for the W particle and Z particle arise through spontaneous symmetry breaking with the Higgs mechanism. This unified theory modeled the electroweak interaction as a force mediated by four particles: the photon for the electromagnetic aspect, and a neutral Z particle, and two charged W particles for the weak aspect. Their theory was first given experimental support by the discovery of weak neutral currents in 1973. In 1983, the Z and W bosons were first produced at CERN by Carlo Rubbia's team. For their insights, Glashow, Salam, and Weinberg were awarded the Nobel Prize in Physics in 1979. Carlo Rubbia and Simon van der Meer received the Prize in 1984.

After Gerardus 't Hooft showed the Glashow–Weinberg–Salam electroweak interactions to be mathematically consistent, the electroweak theory became a template for further attempts at unifying forces. In 1974, Sheldon Glashow and Howard Georgi proposed unifying the strong and electroweak interactions into the Georgi–Glashow model, the first Grand Unified Theory, which would have observable effects for energies much above 100 GeV.

Since then there have been several proposals for Grand Unified Theories, e.g. the Pati–Salam model, although none is currently universally accepted. A major problem for experimental tests of such theories is the energy scale involved, which is well beyond the reach of current accelerators. Grand Unified Theories make predictions for the relative strengths of the strong, weak, and electromagnetic forces, and in 1991 LEP determined that supersymmetric theories have the correct ratio of couplings for a Georgi–Glashow Grand Unified Theory.

Many Grand Unified Theories (but not Pati–Salam) predict that the proton can decay, and if this were to be seen, details of the decay products could give hints at more aspects of the Grand Unified Theory. It is at present unknown if the proton can decay, although experiments have determined a lower bound of 1035 years for its lifetime.

Current status 

Theoretical physicists have not yet formulated a widely accepted, consistent theory that combines general relativity and quantum mechanics to form a theory of everything. Trying to combine the graviton with the strong and electroweak interactions leads to fundamental difficulties and the resulting theory is not renormalizable. The incompatibility of the two theories remains an outstanding problem in the field of physics.

See also 
 Sheldon Glashow

References

Further reading
Jeroen van Dongen Einstein's Unification, Cambridge University Press (July 26, 2010)
Varadarajan, V.S. Supersymmetry for Mathematicians: An Introduction (Courant Lecture Notes), American Mathematical Society (July 2004)

External links

On the History of Unified Field Theories, by Hubert F. M. Goenner

 Particle physics
Theories of gravity
 Unsolved problems in physics